A canticle (from the Latin canticulum, a diminutive of canticum, "song") is a hymn, psalm or other Christian song of praise with lyrics usually taken from biblical or holy texts. Canticles are used in Christian liturgy.

Catholic Church

Prior to the Pope Pius X's 1911 reforms, the following cycle of seven Canticles was used at Lauds:
 Sunday – The Song of the Three Holy Children
 Monday – The Song of Isaiah the Prophet
 Tuesday – The Song of Hezekiah
 Wednesday – The Song of Hannah
 Thursday – The (First) Song of Moses
 Friday – The Prayer of Habakkuk
 Saturday – The (Second) Song of Moses

These are rather long, and the weekday ones display something of a penitential theme, but some were not often used, as all feasts and the weekdays in Eastertide had the Canticle of Daniel, assigned to Sunday.

The 1911 reform introduced for weekdays not of penitential nature, and for lesser feasts and days of the lesser octaves, the following Canticles:
 Monday – The Song of David the King
 Tuesday – The Song of Tobit
 Wednesday – The Song of Judith
 Thursday – The Song of Jeremiah the Prophet
 Friday – The (Second) Song of Isaiah the Prophet
 Saturday – The Song of the Ecclesiasticus

For weekdays in Advent, Shrovetide, Lent and the quarterly Ember Days, if not superseded by higher-ranking feasts—due to the multitude of feasts in the rest of the year, these make up almost the totality of the days that did not have the Canticle of Daniel before—the original seven Canticles would still be used.

The Liturgy of the Hours uses one canticle from the Old Testament each day at Lauds, "each weekday of the four-week cycle [has] its own proper canticle and on Sunday the two sections of the Canticle of the Three Children may be alternated". The liturgy prior to the reform after Vatican II used fourteen Old Testament Canticles in two weekly cycles.

At Vespers according to the Liturgy of the Hours, a Canticle from the New Testament is used. These follow a weekly cycle, with some exceptions.

Additionally, the following Canticles from the Gospel of Luke (also called the “Evangelical Canticles”) are said daily:
 At Lauds, the "Canticle of Zachary" (Luke 1:68-79), commonly referred to as the Benedictus.
 At Vespers, the "Canticle of Mary" (Luke 1:46-55), commonly known as the Magnificat.
 At Compline, the "Canticle of Simeon" (Luke 2:29-32), commonly referred to as the Nunc dimittis.

This usage is also followed by Lutheran churches.

Anglican
In the Church of England, Morning and Evening Prayer according to the Book of Common Prayer make extensive use of canticles, specifically the below and also in some enumerations, the Venite (Psalm 95). Nonetheless, the only text called a canticle in the rubrics of the Book of Common Prayer is the Benedicite, while the Song of Solomon is called the Canticles in the Lectionary.

 At Morning Prayer:
 Te Deum or Benedicite (Daniel 3:57–88 in the Apocrypha)
 Benedictus (Luke 1:68–79) or Jubilate Deo (Psalm 100)
 At Evening Prayer:
 Magnificat (Luke 1:46–55) or Cantate Domino (Psalm 98) 
 Nunc dimittis (Luke 2:29–32) or Deus misereatur (Psalm 67)

Eastern Christian

In the Eastern Orthodox and Greek-Catholic Churches there are nine Biblical Canticles (or Odes) that are chanted at Matins. These form the basis of the Canon, a major component of Matins.

The nine Canticles are as follows:
 Canticle One — The (First) Song of Moses
 Canticle Two — The (Second) Song of Moses
 Canticle Three — The Prayer of Hannah
 Canticle Four — The Prayer of Habakkuk
 Canticle Five — The Prayer of Isaiah
 Canticle Six — The Prayer of Jonah
 Canticle Seven — The Prayer of the Three Holy Children (Daniel 3:26-56)
 Canticle Eight — The Song of the Three Holy Children (Daniel 3:57-88)
 Canticle Nine — The Song of the Theotokos; the Song of Zacharias (the Benedictus )

Originally, these Canticles were chanted in their entirety every day, with a short refrain inserted between each verse. Eventually, short verses (troparia) were composed to replace these refrains, a process traditionally inaugurated by Saint Andrew of Crete.
Gradually over the centuries, the verses of the Biblical Canticles were omitted (except for the Magnificat) and only the composed troparia were read, linked to the original canticles by an Irmos. During Great Lent however, the original Biblical Canticles are still read.

Another Biblical Canticle, the Nunc Dimittis, is either read or sung at Vespers.

Armenian Liturgy
At Matins (or Midnight Hour; Armenian: Ի մէջ Գիշերի i mej gisheri), one canticle from the Old Testament is sung, associated with a reading from the Psalter, followed by hymns according to tone, season, and feast. There are eight such canticles which are determined by the musical tone of the day. These are, along with their respective portions of the Psalter and their tones:

 Tone Eight — The (First) Song of Moses— Psalms 1-17
 Tone One — The (Second) Song of Moses — Psalms 18-35
 Tone Two — The (Second) Song of Moses — Psalms 36-54
 Tone Three — The Prayer of Hannah — Psalms 55-71
 Tone Four — The Prayer of Isaiah — Psalms 72-88
 Tone Five — The Prayer of Hezekiah — Psalms 89-105
 Tone Six — The Prayer of Jonah with material from Isaiah — Psalms 106-118
 Tone Seven — The Prayer of Habakkuk — Psalms 119-147
Note that Psalms 148-150 and Psalm 151 are not part of this system because they are read every day at the Morning Hour, following the canticles presented below.

At the Morning Hour (Armenian: Յառաւուտու Ժամ haṟavoutou zham), corresponding to Lauds, the following canticles are fixed parts of the service each day:

 The Prayer of the Three Holy Children (Daniel 3:26-88)
 The Song of the Theotokos; 
 The Song of Zacharias (the Benedictus )
 The Prayer of Simeon (Nunc dimittis )

Following the Song of the Three Youths and the Prayer of Simeon there are sets of hymns as well as other texts which are proper to the commemoration of the day or of the liturgical season.

In the other hours, sections of these and other canticles are included in fixed material, consisting of amalgams of verse material from the Old Testament: 
Ninth Hour: a citation of Daniel 3:35;
Peace Hour (after Vespers): , ;
Rest Hour (after the Peace Hour): Daniel 3:29-34, Luke 2:29-32, Luke 1:16-55.

This list does not take into account citations of these texts in the Divine Liturgy (Armenian: Պատարագ patarag) or in the movable Old Testament verse material or in hymnody.

Coptic Orthodoxy

In the Coptic Orthodox Church there are four Biblical Canticles (or ϩⲱⲥ (hos, literally praise/song)) that are chanted during midnight praises. The fourth of these canticles is also chanted during vespers praises.

The four Canticles are as follows:

 The First Canticle - The Song of Moses
 The Second Canticle -  (135 LXX)
 The Third Canticle - The Song of the Three Holy Children (Daniel 3:52-88 LXX, including The Benedicite)
 The Fourth Canticle -

See also
 Hymns to Mary
 A Canticle for Leibowitz
 Canticle, the counterpoint melody to Scarborough Fair by Simon & Garfunkel

References

External links

 
Christian liturgical music
Genres of Byzantine music
Liturgy of the Hours